Daniel Weichel (born November 22, 1984) is a German mixed martial artist currently competing in Bellator's Featherweight division. A professional competitor since 2002, he has also competed in M-1 Global and Shooto. As of November 22, 2022, he is #9 in the Bellator Featherweight Rankings.

Background
Born and raised in Germany, Weichel originally began training in Jujutsu at the age of 14, before transitioning into Brazilian jiu-jitsu a year later. Weichel also began training in Muay Thai and then wrestling when he was 17, with both freestyle wrestling and Greco-Roman wrestling, as well as boxing. In 2014 Daniel received his blackbelt in Brazilian jiu-jitsu by Din Thomas.

Mixed martial arts career

Early career
Weichel made his professional MMA debut in May 2002.  Over the next four and a half years of his career, he amassed a record of 15–2.

During this time, Weichel competed on a German mixed martial arts reality show titled M.A.X. (Martial Arts Xtreme) in 2006, where he made it to the final against Ivan Mussardo. However, the production shut down before the match could actually take place.  The two did eventually meet in 2009, where Weichel won by unanimous decision.

M-1 Global
Following a rough patch where he went 3-4 (including two losses to future UFC fighters Paul Daley and Dan Hardy), Weichel joined the Russian MMA organization M-1 Global, going 5–0 on their M-1 Challengers series.

Weichel eventually challenged for the M-1 Global Lightweight Championship as he faced Jose Figueroa in November 2011 at M-1 Global: Fedor vs. Monson. He won the bout and title via knockout in the first round.

Weichel's reign as champion would be short lived though. He lost the belt in his first defense in June 2012 against Musa Khamanaev at M-1 Global: Fedor vs. Rizzo. He lost the bout via submission in the first round.

Bellator MMA
In September 2013, it was announced that Weichel had signed a contract with Bellator MMA and would compete in their Season Ten Featherweight Tournament.

Weichel made his Bellator debut in the Season Ten Featherweight Tournament Quarterfinal facing Scott Cleve at Bellator 110 on February 28, 2014 he won via submission with a rear-naked choke.

Weichel fought against Matt Bessette at Bellator 114 on March 28, 2014 in the Featherweight tournament semifinals. He won the bout via unanimous decision.

Weichel faced Desmond Green in the Tournament Final at Bellator 119 on May 9, 2014. He won the fight via submission in the second round. He also became the final tournament winner as Bellator moves away from tournament era.

Weichel faced Pat Curran on February 13, 2015 at Bellator 133. He won the fight via split decision.

Replacing an injured Georgi Karakhanyan, Weichel faced Bellator Featherweight Champion Patrício Freire at Bellator 138 on June 19, 2015. Despite dropping Freire with a series of strikes the waning seconds of the first round, Weichel lost the fight via knockout when Freire rallied with a counter left hook early in the second round.

Weichel faced Georgi Karakhanyan at Bellator 147 on December 4, 2015. He won by unanimous decision.

Weichel next faced up-and-comer Emmanuel Sanchez at Bellator 159 on July 22, 2016. He won via split decision.

Weichel faced Brian Moore at Bellator 169 on December 16, 2016. He won the fight via submission in the first round.

Weichel faced John Teixeira at Bellator 177 on April 14, 2017. He won via split decision.

After four consecutive victories, Weichel was expected to face newly crowned featherweight champion, Patrício Freire, in a second fight at Bellator 188 on November 16, 2017. However, Freire pulled out of the fight due to multiple injuries. Weichel eventually faced Patricio Freire in a rematch in the main event at Bellator 203 on July 14, 2018. He lost the back-and-forth fight via split decision.

After the title fight, Weichel faced Goiti Yamauchi at Bellator 210 on November 30, 2018. He lost the close fight via split decision.

As the opening round fight of the Bellator Featherweight World Grand Prix First Round, Weichel faced Saul Rogers at Bellator 228 on September 28, 2019. Weichel won the fight via unanimous decision as he rocked Rogers late in the opening round.

In the quarterfinals, Weichel was initially expected to face Emmanuel Sanchez in a rematch in February 2020. However, the date got pushed back and they were next expected to face at Bellator 241 on March 13, 2020. However, the whole event was eventually cancelled due to the prevailing COVID-19 pandemic. The bout was rescheduled and took place at Bellator 252 on November 12. Weichel lost the bout via unanimous decision.

Weichel faced Keoni Diggs on June 25, 2021 at Bellator 261. He won the close bout via split decision.

Weichel faced Pedro Carvalho at Bellator 270 on November 5, 2021. He lost the bout via unanimous decision.

Weichel faced Rob Whiteford on May 13, 2022 at Bellator 281. He won the bout via TKO stoppage in the first round.

Weichel was set to face Akhmed Magomedov at Bellator 288 on November 18, 2022. However, Magomedov pulled out due to unknown reason and was replaced by Timur Khizriev. Weichel lost the bout via unanimous decision.

Championships and accomplishments
Bellator MMA
Bellator Season Ten Featherweight Tournament Winner
M-1 Global
M-1 Global Lightweight Championship (One time)

Mixed martial arts record

|-
|Loss
|align=center|42–14
|Timur Khizriev
|Decision (unanimous)
|Bellator 288
|
|align=center|3
|align=center|5:00
|Chicago, Illinois, United States
|
|-
|Win
|align=center|42–13
|Rob Whiteford
|TKO (punches)
|Bellator 281
|
|align=center|1
|align=center|1:12
|London, England
|
|-
|Loss
|align=center|41–13
|Pedro Carvalho
|Decision (unanimous)
|Bellator 270
|
|align=center|3
|align=center|5:00
|Dublin, Ireland
|
|-
|Win
|align=center|41–12
|Keoni Diggs
|Decision (split)
|Bellator 261 
|
|align=center|3
|align=center|5:00
|Uncasville, Connecticut, United States 
|
|-
|Loss
|align=center|40–12
|Emmanuel Sanchez 
|Decision (unanimous)
|Bellator 252 
|
|align=center|5
|align=center|5:00
|Uncasville, Connecticut, United States 
|
|-
|Win
|align=center|40–11
|Saul Rogers
|Decision (unanimous) 
|Bellator 228
|
|align=center|3
|align=center|5:00
|Inglewood, California, United States
|
|-
| Loss
|align=center|39–11
|Goiti Yamauchi
|Decision (split)
|Bellator 210
|
|align=center|3
|align=center|5:00
|Thackerville, Oklahoma, United States
|
|-
| Loss
|align=center|39–10
|Patrício Pitbull
|Decision (split)
|Bellator 203
|
|align=center|5
|align=center|5:00
|Rome, Italy
|
|-
| Win
|align=center|39–9
|John Macapá
|Decision (split)
|Bellator 177
|
|align=center|3
|align=center|5:00
|Budapest, Hungary
|
|-
| Win
|align=center|38–9
|Brian Moore
|Submission (arm-triangle choke)
|Bellator 169
|
|align=center|1
|align=center|4:44
|Dublin, Ireland
|
|-
| Win
|align=center|37–9
|Emmanuel Sanchez
|Decision (split)
|Bellator 159
|
|align=center|3
|align=center|5:00
|Mulvane, Kansas, United States
|
|-
| Win
|align=center|36–9
|Georgi Karakhanyan
|Decision (unanimous)
|Bellator 147
|
|align=center|3
|align=center|5:00
|San Jose, California, United States 
|
|-
| Loss
| align=center| 35–9
| Patrício Pitbull
| KO (punch)
| Bellator 138
| 
| align=center| 2
| align=center| 0:32
| St. Louis, Missouri, United States
| 
|-
| Win 
| align=center| 35–8
| Pat Curran 
| Decision (split)
| Bellator 133
| 
| align=center| 3
| align=center| 5:00
| Fresno, California, United States
|
|-
| Win
| align=center| 34–8
| Desmond Green
| Submission (rear-naked choke)
| Bellator 119
| 
| align=center| 2
| align=center| 2:07
| Rama, Ontario, Canada
| 
|-
| Win
| align=center| 33–8
| Matt Bessette
| Decision (unanimous)
| Bellator 114
| 
| align=center| 3
| align=center| 5:00
| West Valley City, Utah, United States
| 
|-
| Win
| align=center| 32–8
| Scott Cleve
| Submission (rear-naked choke)
| Bellator 110
| 
| align=center| 1
| align=center| 3:46
| Uncasville, Connecticut, United States
| 
|-
| Win
| align=center| 31–8
| Artiom Damkovsky
| Submission (arm-triangle choke)
| M-1 Challenge 37: Khamanaev vs. Puhakka
| 
| align=center| 2
| align=center| 4:24
| Orenburg, Russia 
| 
|-
| Win
| align=center| 30–8
| Georgi Stoyanov
| Submission (rear-naked choke) 
| M-1 Challenge 36: Confrontation in Mytishchi
| 
| align=center| 2
| align=center| 2:24
| Mytishchi, Russia
| 
|-
| Win
| align=center| 29–8
| Semen Tyrlya
| Submission (rear-naked choke) 
| Respect Fighting Championship 8
| 
| align=center| 1
| align=center| 3:40
| Wuppertal, Germany
| 
|-
| Loss
| align=center| 28–8
| Musa Khamanaev
| Submission (heel hook) 
| M-1 Global: Fedor vs. Rizzo
| 
| align=center| 1
| align=center| 1:48
| St. Petersburg, Russia
| |
|-
| Win
| align=center| 28–7
| Jose Figueroa
| KO (punches)
| M-1 Global: Fedor vs. Monson
| 
| align=center| 1
| align=center| 1:50
| Moscow, Russia, 
| 
|-
| Win
| align=center| 27–7
| Beau Baker
| Decision (unanimous) 
| M-1 Challenge 26: Garner vs. Bennett 2
| 
| align=center| 3
| align=center| 5:00
| Costa Mesa, California, United States
| 
|-
| Win
| align=center| 26–7
| Magomedrasul Khasbulaev
| Technical submission (triangle choke) 
| M-1 Challenge 23: Guram vs. Grishin
| 
| align=center| 1
| align=center| 3:26
| Moscow, Russia 
| 
|-
| Win
| align=center| 25–7
| Yuri Ivlev
| TKO (doctor stoppage)
| M-1 Challenge 21: Guram vs. Garner
| 
| align=center| 3
| align=center| 2:24
| St. Petersburg, Russia
| 
|-
| Win
| align=center| 24–7
| Avtandil Shoshiashvili
| Submission (rear-naked choke) 
| Fight Night Merseburg 3
| 
| align=center| 1
| align=center| 4:20
| Spergau, Saxony-Anhalt, Germany
| 
|-
| Loss
| align=center| 23–7
| Rob Sinclair
| TKO (punches) 
| BAMMA 3: Horwich vs. Watson
| 
| align=center| 1
| align=center| 4:03
| Birmingham, England
| 
|-
| Win
| align=center| 23–6
| Victor Kuku
| Submission (rear-naked choke) 
| TFS: Mix Fight Gala IX
| 
| align=center| 1
| align=center| 2:57
| Darmstadt, Germany
| 
|-
| Win
| align=center| 22–6
| Ivan Musardo
| Decision (unanimous)
| Shooto: Switzerland 6
| 
| align=center| 3
| align=center| 5:00
| Zürich, Switzerland
| 
|-
| Win
| align=center| 21–6
| Danial Sharifi
| Submission (guillotine choke) 
| M-1 Challenge 18: Netherlands Day One
| 
| align=center| 1
| align=center| 2:53
| Hilversum, The Netherlands
| 
|-
| Win
| align=center| 20–6
| Jimmy Sidoni
| TKO (punches) 
| TFS: Mix Fight Gala 8
| 
| align=center| 1
| align=center| 2:32
| Darmstadt, Germany 
| 
|-
| Win
| align=center| 19–6
| Fatih Dogan
| Submission (D'arce choke) 
| M-1 Challenge 13: Bulgaria
| 
| align=center| 1
| align=center| 2:29
| Bourgas, Bulgaria
| 
|-
| Loss
| align=center| 18–6
| Peter Irving
| Submission (rear-naked choke) 
| Strike and Submit 8
| 
| align=center| 2
| align=center| 1:47
| Gateshead, Tyne and Wear, England
| 
|-
| Loss
| align=center| 18–5
| Dan Hardy
| TKO (elbows) 
| UF: Punishment
| 
| align=center| 2
| align=center| N/A
| Doncaster, England
| 
|-
| Win
| align=center| 18–4
| Ian Jones
| Submission (armbar) 
| Gorilla Fight 2
| 
| align=center| 1
| align=center| 2:38
| Mannheim, Germany
| 
|-
| Loss
| align=center| 17–4
| Jason Jones
| TKO (punch and knee) 
| M-1: Slamm
| 
| align=center| 1
| align=center| 0:06
| Almere, Flevoland, The Netherlands
| 
|-
| Win
| align=center| 17–3
| Chas Jacquier
| Submission (choke) 
| TFS: Mix Fight Gala VI
| 
| align=center| 1
| align=center| N/A
| Darmstadt, Germany
| 
|-
| Win
| align=center| 16–3
| Fatih Balci
| Submission (triangle choke) 
| Stapel Fighting Challenge
| 
| align=center| 1
| align=center| N/A
| Germany
| 
|-
| Loss
| align=center| 15–3
| Paul Daley
| KO (knee) 
| FX3: Fight Night 4
| 
| align=center| 1
| align=center| 2:55
| Reading, Berkshire, England
| 
|-
| Win
| align=center| 15–2
| Amir Lekaj
| Submission (kimura) 
| Martial Arts Xtreme 8
| 
| align=center| 1
| align=center| N/A
| Berlin, Germany
| 
|-
| Win
| align=center| 14–2
| Marcelo Lopez
| Decision (split) 
| Martial Arts Xtreme 6
| 
| align=center| 3
| align=center| 3:00
| Berlin, Germany
| 
|-
| Win
| align=center| 13–2
| Hugo Blatter
| Submission (rear-naked choke) 
| Martial Arts Xtreme 4
| 
| align=center| 1
| align=center| 2:47
| Berlin, Germany
| 
|-
| Win
| align=center| 12–2
| Josenildo Ramalho
| Decision (majority) 
| CWFC: Strike Force 6
| 
| align=center| 3
| align=center| 5:00
| Coventry, West Midlands, England
| 
|-
| Win
| align=center| 11–2
| Dennis Siver
| Submission (rear-naked choke) 
| TFS: Mix Fight Gala 3
| 
| align=center| 1
| align=center| N/A
| Darmstadt, Germany
| 
|-
| Loss
| align=center| 10–2
| Thiago Tavares
| Submission (guillotine choke) 
| CWFC: Enter the Wolfslair
| 
| align=center| 3
| align=center| 4:47
| Liverpool, Merseyside, England
| 
|-
|  Win
| align=center| 10–1
| Johan Antonsson
| Submission (rear-naked choke)
| EVT 5: Phoenix
| 
| align=center| 1
| align=center| 3:41
| Sweden
| 
|-
|  Win
| align=center| 9–1
| Boris Jonstomp
| Submission (rear-naked choke)
| EVT 5: Phoenix
| 
| align=center| 2
| align=center| 2:12
| Sweden
| 
|-
|  Win
| align=center| 8–1
| Mike Lucero
| Submission (guillotine choke)
| KOTC 55: Grudge Match
| 
| align=center| 1
| align=center| 3:41
| Albuquerque, New Mexico
| 
|-
|  Win
| align=center| 7–1
| Joakim Engberg
| Decision (unanimous)
| EVT 4: Gladiators
| 
| align=center| 3
| align=center| 5:00
| Stockholm, Sweden
| 
|-
|  Win
| align=center| 6–1
| Abdul Mohammed
| Decision (unanimous)
| P & G 3: Glory Days
| 
| align=center| N/A
| align=center| N/A
| Newcastle, England
| 
|-
|  Win
| align=center| 5–1
| Gaz Roriston
| Submission (americana)
| EVT 3: Inferno
| 
| align=center| 2
| align=center| 1:57
| Copenhagen, Denmark
| 
|-
|  Loss
| align=center| 4–1
| Mattias Awad
| Decision (unanimous)
| EVT 2: Hazard
| 
| align=center| 3
| align=center| 5:00
| Stockholm, Sweden
| 
|-
|  Win
| align=center| 4–0
| Malte Janssen
| KO (head kick)
| Outsider Cup 2
| 
| align=center| 2
| align=center| 0:13
| Lübbecke, Germany
| 
|-
|  Win
| align=center| 3–0
| Masaya Takita
| Decision (unanimous)
| Shooto: 11/25 in Kitazawa Town Hall
| 
| align=center| 2
| align=center| 5:00
| Setagaya, Tokyo, Japan
| 
|-
|  Win
| align=center| 2–0
| Eduardo Guimaraes
| KO (flying knee) 
| Shooto Holland: Holland vs. the World
| 
| align=center| 1
| align=center| 2:50
| Holland, Netherlands
| 
|-
|  Win
| align=center| 1–0
| Vincent Latoel
| Submission (armbar)
| Shooto Holland: The Lords of the Ring
| 
| align=center| 1
| align=center| 1:48
| Holland, Netherlands
| 
|}

See also
 List of current Bellator fighters
 List of male mixed martial artists

References

External links
 

Living people
1984 births
German male mixed martial artists
Featherweight mixed martial artists
Lightweight mixed martial artists
German jujutsuka
German practitioners of Brazilian jiu-jitsu
People awarded a black belt in Brazilian jiu-jitsu
Mixed martial artists utilizing jujutsu
Mixed martial artists utilizing Greco-Roman wrestling
Mixed martial artists utilizing freestyle wrestling
Mixed martial artists utilizing Muay Thai
Mixed martial artists utilizing boxing
Mixed martial artists utilizing Brazilian jiu-jitsu
German Muay Thai practitioners
People from Michelstadt
Sportspeople from Darmstadt (region)